The 1992–93 Segunda Divisão de Honra season was the third season of the competition and the 59th season of recognised second-tier football in Portugal.

Overview
The league was contested by 18 teams with Estrela Amadora winning the championship and gaining promotion to the Primeira Divisão along with União Funchal and Vitória Setúbal. At the other end of the table CD Feirense, Amora FC and Benfica Castelo Branco were relegated to the Segunda Divisão.

League standings

Footnotes

External links
 Portugal 1992/93 - RSSSF (Paulo Claro)
 Portuguese II Liga 1992/1993 - footballzz.co.uk

Portuguese Second Division seasons
Port
2